Leo Reinhold Ehrnrooth  (10 March 1877 in Helsinki – 26 July 1951 in Sweden) was a Finnish politician from Swedish People's Party of Finland. 

He was a member of the Senate of Finland. He served as Minister of Trade and Industry in 1920, and as Minister of the Interior from March 1943 to August 1944.

References

1877 births
1951 deaths
Politicians from Helsinki
People from Uusimaa Province (Grand Duchy of Finland)
Finnish people of German descent
Swedish People's Party of Finland politicians
Finnish senators
Ministers of Trade and Industry of Finland
Ministers of the Interior of Finland
Members of the Diet of Finland
Members of the Parliament of Finland (1907–08)
Members of the Parliament of Finland (1908–09)
Members of the Parliament of Finland (1916–17)
University of Helsinki alumni

Leo